Jiřina Hájková (born 31 January 1954 in Děčín) is a Czech former field hockey player who competed in the 1980 Summer Olympics.

References

External links
 

1954 births
Living people
Czech female field hockey players
Olympic field hockey players of Czechoslovakia
Field hockey players at the 1980 Summer Olympics
Olympic silver medalists for Czechoslovakia
Olympic medalists in field hockey
Medalists at the 1980 Summer Olympics
People from Děčín
Sportspeople from the Ústí nad Labem Region